This page shows the results of the 1997 Men's Central American and Caribbean Basketball Championship, also known as the 1997 Centrobasket, which was held in the city of Tegucigalpa, Honduras from May 25 to June 1, 1997. The top four teams qualified for the 1997 Pan American Tournament, held from August 21 to August 31 in Montevideo, Uruguay.

Competing nations

Preliminary round

1997-05-24

1997-05-25

1997-05-26

 

1997-05-25

1997-05-26

1997-05-27

Notes

Consolidation Round

1997-05-28

1997-05-30

1997-05-28

1997-05-30

Final round
1997-05-31 — 1st/4th place

1997-06-01 — 5th/6th place

1997-06-01 — 3rd/4th place

1997-06-01 — 1st/2nd place

Final ranking

1. 

2. 

3. 

4. 

5. 

6. 

7. 

—

Team Rosters
1.Cuba: Caballero · Abréu · Echevarría · Matamoros · Diago · Ro. Herrera · Pérez · Borrell · Vázquez · Rojas · Núñez · Ru. Herrera · All. Miguel Calderón

References
Results

Centrobasket
1996–97 in North American basketball
1997 in Central American sport
1997 in Caribbean sport
1997 in Honduran sport
International sports competitions hosted by Honduras
Basketball in Honduras